"Strangers" is a song written by Dave Davies and performed by British rock group the Kinks. It was released in November 1970 on the Kinks' LP record album Lola Versus Powerman and the Moneygoround, Part One, which is best known for producing the hit single "Lola". "Strangers" is one of two tracks written by Dave Davies on the album, the other being "Rats".  He has said that the song is about an old school friend who died of a drug overdose.

Although never released as a single, it has remained popular with fans to this day, especially after it was used in the 2007 Wes Anderson film The Darjeeling Limited (along with two other album tracks written by Ray Davies, "This Time Tomorrow" and "Powerman").

A cover of the song recorded live by Norah Jones was included as a bonus track on the deluxe edition of her 2009 album The Fall. A cover by Feist was released on the CD included with the DVD of her documentary Look at What the Light Did Now. Indie folk rock duo Wye Oak performed a version of the song in May 2010 for [[The A.V. Club|The A.V. Club'''s]] A.V. Undercover series. It has also been covered by alternative rock supergroup Golden Smog on their album Another Fine Day, Indie rock band Piebald, folk band Crooked Fingers, punk singer Ben Weasel on his first solo album Fidatevi, folk pop band Lucius on the extended edition of their 2016 album Good Grief'', and by Black Pumas on the 2021 "Expanded Deluxe Edition" of their self-titled album.

References

The Kinks songs
Songs written by Dave Davies
1970 songs
Song recordings produced by Ray Davies